

Births and deaths

Births
 Kirsty MacColl (1959–2000)

Recordings
 1953 "The Queen Among The Heather" (Jeannie Robertson)

Scottish music
1950s in British music
1950s in Scotland